The Silent Corner and the Empty Stage is the third album by British singer-songwriter Peter Hammill. It was released on Charisma Records in 1974, during a hiatus in the activities of Hammill's progressive rock band Van der Graaf Generator. Other ex-members of Van der Graaf Generator also perform on the recording.

The cover was designed by Bettina Hohls, ex-member of the psychedelic German rock band Ash Ra Tempel. Hohls also contributed to the cover of Hammill's earlier album Chameleon in the Shadow of the Night.

The lengthy "A Louse is not a Home" is a song about the nature of identity. It was originally written for Van der Graaf Generator's album following Pawn Hearts, an album that because of the band's split never came to be. It features Van der Graaf Generator's ex-members and was (just like "In the Black Room" from the previous album) played live by the group already in mid 1972 (just before the split) and again with the reformed band in 1975. "Forsaken Gardens" (also played live in 1975) and "Red Shift" are two more songs which feature ex-VdGG members. "The Lie (Bernini's Saint Theresa)" partly alludes to the Ecstasy of St Theresa by Bernini. "Red Shift" features Spirit guitarist Randy California on lead guitar. Hammill has often performed the song "Modern" in concert. "Wilhelmina" is written for Guy Evans' newborn baby girl, Tamra.

Track listing

Personnel 

 Peter Hammill – vocals, electric and acoustic guitars (1, 2, 5, 6), piano (2, 3, 4, 7), Mellotron (1, 2), bass guitar (1, 2, 6), harmonium (1), oscillator (6)
 Hugh Banton – Hammond organ, bass pedals and bass guitar (3, 4, 7), Farfisa organ (5), backing vocals
 Guy Evans – percussion, drums (4, 5, 7)
 David Jackson – flute, alto, tenor, and soprano saxophones (4, 5, 7)
 Randy California – lead guitar (5)

Technical
Peter Hammill – recording engineer (Sofa Sound, Sussex)
Pat Moran – recording engineer (Rockfield Studios, Monmouth)
David Hentschel – mixing (Trident Studios, London)
Bettina Hohls – artwork

References

External links
 Album information on the unofficial VdGG site
 An essay in French about "The Lie"

Peter Hammill albums
1974 albums
Charisma Records albums
Albums recorded at Rockfield Studios
Albums recorded at Trident Studios